Football is the most popular sport in Tunisia. It was first introduced by Italian migrants. The governing body is the Tunisian Football Federation.

Domestic Leagues

The game is played nationwide with three professional leagues: LP-1, LP-2 & LP-3 and at an amateur level in the 4 regions and 24 governorates that make up the country.

National team 

Tunisia have reached 6 FIFA World Cup final competitions (1978, 1998, 2002, 2006, 2018 and 2022), and have also appeared at the African Cup of Nations on 13 occasions, winning once (2004).

+50,000-capacity stadiums in Tunisia

References